Paul Milde (born 25 January 1995) is a German footballer who plays as a forward for Energie Cottbus.

Career
Milde began his career as a youth with SC Borea Dresden, where his father Rocco was working as a coach, before joining Dynamo Dresden in 2010. He was promoted to the first team three years later, and made his debut in November 2013, as a substitute for Cheikh Gueye in a 3–0 defeat to Karlsruher SC in the 2. Bundesliga.

Personal life

Milde's father, Rocco, and uncle, Tino, were both footballers. Both were also forwards, and Rocco had three spells with Dynamo Dresden.

References

External links

1995 births
People from Pirna
Footballers from Saxony
21st-century German people
Living people
German footballers
Association football forwards
Dynamo Dresden players
Dynamo Dresden II players
FSV Union Fürstenwalde players
FSV Budissa Bautzen players
Chemnitzer FC players
TSV Steinbach Haiger players
FC Energie Cottbus players
2. Bundesliga players
3. Liga players
Regionalliga players
Oberliga (football) players